Marcin Kazanowski, (1563/66 – 19 October 1636) was a noble (szlachcic), magnate, castellan of Halice from 1622, voivode of Podole Voivodeship from 1632 and Field Crown Hetman of the Polish–Lithuanian Commonwealth from 1633.

Married to Katarzyna Starzycka in 1600, he was the father of Dominik Aleksander Kazanowski (1605–1648), voivode of Bracław. His family, the Kazanowski family, descendants of Mediolan Comeses, founded the town of Kazanów in 1566.

Under Hetman Stanisław Koniecpolski, he was one of the commanding officers in the Battle of Górzno in 1629 against the Swedes.

The discovery legend of the Madonna Bołszowiecka relates that during one of the battles against Tatars, Hetman Kazanowski discovered the icon of the Blessed Virgin. This was viewed by his troops as a miracle and boosted their morale, leading to a victory.

Under King Władysław IV Vasa, he also participated in the wars against the Russian Tsardom.

See also
Adam Kazanowski
Marcin Kazanowski (?-1587)
Zygmunt Kazanowski

References

External links
Battle of Górzno 
Legend of Madonna Bolszowiecka discovery 
Kazanowski family genealogy

Field Crown Hetmans
1560s births
1636 deaths
Year of birth uncertain
Marcin
Members of the Sejm of the Polish–Lithuanian Commonwealth
Polish people of the Livonian campaign of Stephen Báthory
Polish people of the Polish–Muscovite War (1605–1618)
Polish people of the Smolensk War